The Open Air Ethnographic Museum «Etar» (usually referred to as Етъра, Etara) is an open-air museum and a neighbourhood of Gabrovo (8 km south of its center) in northern Bulgaria. It is on the northern edge of the Bulgarka Nature Park, between the park and the city of Gabrovo.

It presents the Bulgarian customs, culture and craftsmanship. It spans over an area of 7 ha and contains a total of 50 objects, including water installations and houses with craftsmen's workshops attached. As a whole, the complex's goal is to illustrate the architecture, way of life and economy of Gabrovo and the region during the Bulgarian National Revival.

The museum's construction started in 1963 under the direction and project of Lazar Donkov. The pre-existing Karadzheyka water-mill, built around 1780, was thoroughly reconstructed, with the other objects being constructed later. The complex was opened on 7 September 1964 and proclaimed a national park in 1967, as well as a monument of culture in 1971.

The park features typical Bulgarian revival houses with two floors, bay windows, a clock tower, and a beautifully decorated house by Saakov featuring 21 windows. Using original instruments and following the old traditions, locals represent around 20 characteristics of the regional crafts such as wood-carving, pottery, coppersmith crafts, furriery, cutlery making, needlework etc. There are shops for souvenirs. There are numerous restaurants in the park where tourist could consume local Bulgarian cuisine. There are visitors to the park, from all over the world, all the year round, especially during the annual Christian festivals celebrated in the park, namely, Palm Sunday and Easter.

Sokolski Monastery is situated several kilometers away from Etar.

Gallery

See also
 Battles of the Russo-Turkish War (1877–1878)
 History of Bulgaria
 Bulgarka Nature Park
 Heroes of Shipka
 History of Bulgaria
 Gabrovo City
 Shipka Memorial
 Shipka Pass

External links
 Official website
 Pictures from Etara
 Photos from Ethnographic museum Etar

Museums in Gabrovo Province
Balkan mountains
Open-air museums in Bulgaria
Gabrovo
History museums in Bulgaria
Ethnography of Bulgaria
Articles containing video clips
Living museums